Sir Langham Dale (22 May 1826, Kingsclere, Hampshire - 12 January 1898, Mowbray, Cape Town ) was the Cape Colony's second superintendent general of education.

Life

He was born at Kingsclere, son of Henry Dale and his wife Mary Ann Stroud. He was educated at Christ's Hospital, and graduated at Queen's College, Oxford, in 1847.

Dale was in the following year presented by Sir John Herschel as a professor of classics at the South African College in Cape Town. He held this office until 1858. During a visit to England in that year, he received an honorary doctorate from the University of Glasgow and on his return to the Cape in 1859 he was appointed successor to James Rose-Innes as superintendent general of education.

While serving as chairman of the board of public examiners (1859-1872), he proposed setting up a university as successor to the Examining Board, and in 1873 he became the first vice-chancellor of the University of the Cape of Good Hope. He served as chairman of the Public Service Commission of 1886-87, was a fellow of the Royal Geographical Society and contributed numerous scientific, classical and literary articles to the Cape Monthly Magazine. In 1890, he was elected chancellor of the university. He was a trustee of the South African Public Library for over 30 years, and has served as chairman of the Fine Arts Association Committee and served on the Botanical Garden Committee. In 1899, he was knighted in the Order of St Michael and St George.

At his retirement in 1892, the Cape Parliament granted him a pension equal to his full salary as a tribute to his great contribution to education in the Cape Colony. His successor was Sir Thomas Muir. Dale College in King William's Town was named after him.

Family
Dale married in 1849, at Rondebosch, Emma Ross, daughter of Thomas Ross of the 60th Foot. They had six children.

References

External links

Sir Langham Dale (Biographical details)
Sir Langham Dale: The influence of a Kingsclere man on the education system in South Africa
Highclere Cottage

1826 births
1898 deaths
People from Hampshire (before 1974)
Alumni of The Queen's College, Oxford
Cape Colony people
Academic staff of the University of South Africa
Fellows of the Royal Geographical Society
South African academic administrators
Knights Bachelor